The Basilica of Nuestra Señora de Soledad (Basilica of Our Lady of Solitude) is a Roman Catholic Basilica located in Oaxaca de Juárez, Oaxaca, Mexico. It was built between 1682 and 1690, and is a sanctuary dedicated to Our Lady of Solitude, patron saint of Oaxaca. The architecture style is Baroque, and was intentionally built with low spires and towers, as to better resist earthquakes. The Basilica de la Soledad is part of the Historic Center of Oaxaca City, which was declared World Heritage Site by UNESCO in 1987.

History 
The construction of the Basilica began in 1682 and in 1690 was consecrated by Bishop Sariñana y Cuenca. It was designed by Father Fernando Méndez and the current facade was built between 1717 and 1718, with the assistance of Bishop Angel Maldonado.

Description 

The Basilica of La Soledad is laid out in the shape of a Latin cross. The building was constructed from green cantera, a stone common in parts of Oaxaca.

The west gallery contains a baroque pipe organ dated 1686, restored to playing condition in 2000.

See also 
 Templo de Santo Domingo de Guzmán
 Baroque architecture
 Oaxaca de Juárez

References

Nuestra Senora de la Soledad
Baroque church buildings in Mexico
Churches in Oaxaca
Roman Catholic Ecclesiastical Province of Antequera, Oaxaca
Roman Catholic churches completed in 1690
1690 establishments in New Spain
17th-century Roman Catholic church buildings in Mexico
Spanish Colonial architecture in Mexico